The 1973 Friuli-Venezia Giulia regional election took place on 17 June 1973.

Events
Christian Democracy was by far the largest party, largely ahead of the Italian Communist Party which came second. After the election Christian Democrat Antonio Comelli formed a government with the Italian Socialist Party (which left in 1975), the Italian Democratic Socialist Party and the Italian Republican Party.

Results
Sources: Istituto Cattaneo and Cjargne Online

References

Elections in Friuli-Venezia Giulia
1973 elections in Italy
June 1973 events in Europe